The Mezquita de las Tornerías is a Moorish former mosque in Toledo (Castile-La Mancha, Spain). It was built in the middle of the 11th century on the foundations of Roman architecture, located in the old Muslim neighborhood Arrabal de Francos. Currently it houses the "Center Foundation of Promotion of the Crafts", that can be visited and hosts temporary exhibitions.

The building continued maintaining the Islamic faith in Spain well beyond the reconquista of the city by the Christian troops of Alfonso VI of León and Castile in 1085, until the period of 1498–1505, when it was desacralizated by the Catholic Monarchs. Already as a building for civil use, it went through various vicissitudes, first as an inn in 1505 and then as the headquarters of different businesses and small factories or as a simple home. Its history was lost until the late 19th century, when historians investigating its origins didn't know whether it was a synagogue or a mosque. After the studies, on the 15 of March 1905, the finding of an Arab mosque in the street of the Tornerías was officially communicated to the Real Academia de la Historia.

Features 
The mosque was built on the walls of Roman drinking water tanks for distribution of drinking water throughout the city. The great unevenness of the terrain makes its layout in two floors possible, which is unique. The ground floor, which is accessed from the street of the Tornerías, opens to the Roman water tanks with granite half-point arches. The upper floor houses the place of worship, retaining remains of the mihrab and the wall of the qibla.

Its construction was made based on one of the main mosques of the city of Toledo, the Mosque of Cristo de la Luz or of Bab al-Mardum of the 10th century. Its plan is irregular square and the interior spaces are organized like the former in a plan of nine square compartments, covered by sail-vault domes of brick, except the central one, with special relevance of its ribbed dome. The building has horseshoe arches on low columns with large capitals.

Dating 
Historians cannot agree on its date of construction. It can be in the second half of the 11th century or in the second half of the 12th century.

Gallery

See also
Mosque of Cristo de la Luz
List of former mosques in Spain

Notes

References
Francoise de Montêquin, Compendium of Hispano-Islamic Art and Architecture, St. Paul: Hamline University Press, 1976, ISBN B0006CR5E6, p. 209–210.

External links
Archnet
 (type "Tornerias" in the Buscar-window Images on Banco de imágines e sonidos )
 Foundation Mosque of the Tornerías. Panoramic photographs can be viewed.]
 La Mezquita de Tornerías in Toledo olvidado.

11th-century mosques
Former mosques in Spain
Moorish architecture in Spain
Buildings and structures in Toledo, Spain
Tourist attractions in Toledo, Spain
Architecture of the Taifas